Hurunui District is a territorial local government district within the Canterbury Region on the east coast of New Zealand's South Island, north of Christchurch. It stretches from the east coast to the Main Divide.

Local government
During the period, 1853 to 1876, the area north of the Hurunui River was administered as part of the Nelson Province. After the abolition of the provinces in 1876 the Amuri and Cheviot counties were formed. In the 1989 local government reforms, these counties were merged with Hurunui County to form the present district. The current district mayor is Marie Black, who was elected in 2019 upon the retirement of previous mayor Winton Dalley.

Population

Hurunui District had a population of 12,558 at the 2018 New Zealand census, an increase of 1,029 people (8.9%) since the 2013 census, and an increase of 2,082 people (19.9%) since the 2006 census. There were 4,926 households. There were 6,369 males and 6,192 females, giving a sex ratio of 1.03 males per female. The median age was 44.4 years (compared with 37.4 years nationally), with 2,427 people (19.3%) aged under 15 years, 1,812 (14.4%) aged 15 to 29, 5,841 (46.5%) aged 30 to 64, and 2,478 (19.7%) aged 65 or older.

Ethnicities were 92.0% European/Pākehā, 8.6% Māori, 1.1% Pacific peoples, 3.9% Asian, and 2.1% other ethnicities. People may identify with more than one ethnicity.

The percentage of people born overseas was 16.6, compared with 27.1% nationally.

Although some people objected to giving their religion, 52.5% had no religion, 36.6% were Christian, 0.5% were Hindu, 0.2% were Muslim, 0.2% were Buddhist and 2.0% had other religions.

Of those at least 15 years old, 1,590 (15.7%) people had a bachelor or higher degree, and 2,064 (20.4%) people had no formal qualifications. The median income was $31,600, compared with $31,800 nationally. 1,440 people (14.2%) earned over $70,000 compared to 17.2% nationally. The employment status of those at least 15 was that 5,277 (52.1%) people were employed full-time, 1,788 (17.6%) were part-time, and 195 (1.9%) were unemployed.

Urban areas and settlements
Amberley, the district seat, is the only town in the Hurunui district with a population over 1,000. It is home to  people, % of the district's population.

Other settlements and localities in the district include the following:

 East Hurunui Ward:
 Cheviot Sub-Division:a
 Blythe Valley
 Caverhill
 Cheviot
 Claverley
 Conway Flat
 Domett
 Ferniehurst
 Gore Bay
 Hawkswood
 Hundalee
 Hurunui Mouth
 Leamington
 Mina
 Napenape
 Nonoti
 Parnassus
 Phoebe
 Port Robinson
 Spotswood
 Medina
 Beckenham Hills
 Glenmark Sub-Division:b
 Greta Valley
 Motunau
 Motunau Beach
 Omihi
 Scargill
 Spye
 Waipara
 Stonyhurst
 Davaar

 West Hurunui Ward:
 Amuri Sub-Division:c
 Balmoral
 Culverden
 Mount Lyford2
 Mouse Point
 Pahau
 Rotherham
 Waiau
 Cheddar Valley
 Greenbrae
 Ngawiro
 Red Post Corner
 Woodchester
 Marble Point
 Hurunui Sub-Division:c
 Hawarden
 Horsley Down
 Hurunui
 Masons Flat
 Medbury
 Pyramid Valley
 The Peaks
 Virginia
 Waikari
 Weka Pass
 Lake Sumner
 Hanmer Springs Sub-Division:d
 Boyle Village
 Hanmer Springs2
 Lewis Pass
 Engineers Camp

 South Hurunui Ward:
 Amberley Sub-Division:e
 Amberley1
 Amberley Beach
 Balcairn
 Broomfield
 Glasnevin
 Leithfield
 Leithfield Beach
 Greneys Road
 Teviotdale

References

External links

 Hurunui District Council website